Pizano is a Spanish surname. Notable people with the surname include:

Francisco Pizano (born 1987), Mexican footballer
Luis Pizano, 16th-century Spanish military engineer

See also
Daniel Samper Pizano (born 1945), Colombian lawyer, journalist and writer
Ernesto Samper Pizano

Spanish-language surnames